Jennifer White is a former women's basketball program head coach at St. Edward's University. She played college basketball at Louisiana Tech University where she was a member of the 1981 AIAW Division I and 1982 NCAA Division I National Championship teams. White earned her undergraduate degree in physical education in 1983 and her master's degree in physical education in 1985; both at Louisiana Tech. In 1985 Louisiana Tech head coach Leon Barmore hired White as a full-time assistant coach; the Lady Techsters basketball would win the 1988 NCAA Division I National Championship. In 1990 White left Louisiana Tech to serve as an assistant coach for Jody Conradt at the University of Texas at Austin where she coached until 1993. She then worked a basketball training and conditioning programs for the PlayStrong division of Ironsmith Corporation in Austin, Texas. From 2003 to 2012, White had been with the St. Edward's women's basketball program as head coach and achieved a 91–155 record. White played high school basketball at Loretto High School in Tennessee.

Head coaching record

References

American women's basketball coaches
Living people
Louisiana Tech Lady Techsters basketball coaches
Louisiana Tech Lady Techsters basketball players
Texas Longhorns women's basketball coaches
Year of birth missing (living people)